Tradepoint Rail , formerly known as the Baltimore Industrial Railroad, is a switching and terminal railroad located on Sparrows Point, Maryland in the industrial sector of Baltimore, Maryland.

History
The railroad was originally incorporated as the Baltimore & Sparrows Point Railroad Company. Bethlehem Steel took over the railroad in the early 20th century. In 1916, the railroad was renamed the Patapsco and Back Rivers Railroad. The PBR operated until 2012 when the steel mill closed down; however, in 2014 the remainder of the railroad was bought by Sparrows Point Terminal, LLC (SPT) and named The Baltimore Industrial Railroad. In January 2016 the railroad was renamed Tradepoint Rail (TPR), a part of the Tradepoint Atlantic family of companies. The rebuilt system has  of track, the largest privately owned rail yard on the East Coast, access to Norfolk Southern Railway and CSX Transportation, and a fully operational locomotive shop capable of major repairs.

Steel was the main commodity hauled during the era of the steel mill, but currently most revenue comes from tank car storage.

Locomotive Roster

Roster source: The Patapsco and Back Rivers Railroad: Chronicles of the Push, Bump and Ram by Elmer J. Hall (2010)

All of the TPR locomotives were PBR locomotives.

References

External links

See also
 List of Maryland railroads

Companies based in Baltimore
Maryland railroads
Switching and terminal railroads
Transportation in Baltimore